The 2011 Banja Luka Challenger was a professional tennis tournament played on clay courts. It was the tenth edition of the tournament which was part of the 2011 ATP Challenger Tour. It took place in Banja Luka, Bosnia and Herzegovina between 12 and 18 September 2011.

ATP entrants

Seeds

 1 Rankings are as of August 29, 2011.

Other entrants
The following players received wildcards into the singles main draw:
  Mirza Bašić
  Ivan Bjelica
  Tomislav Brkić
  Goran Tošić

The following players received entry from the qualifying draw:
  Toni Androić
  Nikola Čačić
  Dino Marcan
  Ante Pavić

Champions

Singles

 Blaž Kavčič def.  Pere Riba, 6–4, 6–1

Doubles

 Marco Crugnola /  Rubén Ramírez Hidalgo def.  Jan Mertl /  Matwé Middelkoop, 7–6(7–3), 3–6, [10–8]

External links
Official Website
ITF Search
ATP official site

Banja Luka Challenger
2011 in Bosnia and Herzegovina sport
Banja Luka Challenger